The Deathfest was a one-day music festival currently held annually in May at the University of Leeds, England. It was organised by Gavin McInally, who is also the organiser of the Damnation Festival.

Deathfest 2009
The first annual Deathfest took place on Sunday 3 May 2009 at the University of Leeds. It billed 17 bands over two stages and tickets cost £19.50. Festival headliners were Vader and Leng Tch'e.

Deathfest 2010 "The Second Coming"
The second annual Deathfest took place on Sunday 2 May 2010 at Leeds University. It billed 16 bands over two stages and tickets cost £19.50. Festival headliners were Brujeria and Ramesses.

The end
Following the 2010 festival the organizers announced that 2010 would be the last installment for the festival. Due to poor ticket sales they could no longer afford to keep the festival going. However, its sister festival, Damnation, returned for its sixth installment later in 2010.

References

External links

Official MySpace

Heavy metal festivals in the United Kingdom
Music festivals in Leeds